Tourism in Guyana is a fledgling industry compared to other countries in the Caribbean. Tourism is mainly focused on ecotourism, and accommodations for business travelers. Guyana is home to Kaieteur Falls  and St. George's Cathedral.

In 2020,18 businesses and 12 tour guides were licensed with the Guyana Tourism Authority (GTA).

International tourism 
Mark Ellwood, contributing editor for Conde Nast Traveler, has suggested thinking of Guyana "as a bonus Caribbean country" in terms of its cultural history even though it is physically part of South America.

Natural heritage 
The primary draw for tourists from abroad is Guyana's Amazon Rainforest, considered one of the most pristine, untouched forests in the world. Core markets are visitors from North America and the UK (also home to a large Guyanese diaspora) and some interest from markets like Germany and the Netherlands. Guyana is South America's only English-speaking country. The GTA benchmarks its practices against the Green Destinations Standard, a Global Sustainable Tourism Council-recognized set of objective criteria for "measuring, monitoring and improving the sustainability policy in light of the growing interest in sustainable tourism". Sustainable tourism is a key factor in hinterland development, offering economic diversity to the area, through Amerindian villages, such as lodges at Rewa and Surama, and the Iwokrama International Centre for Rain Forest Conservation and Development. Tourism is seen as a way to provide employment in these remote communities, combatting the high migration rate out of these villages.

Eco-tourism activities include birdwatching and catch and release fishing. 

Among many sites, Guyana is the home to the majestic Kaeitur Falls. The highest one drop fall in the world.

Sector growth 
The oil industry, and its potential wealth boom, has encouraged development in the tourism industry, such as the building of a second Marriott Hotel slated for completion in 2023. COVID-19 severely damaged the economies of the tourism-dependent Caribbean countries, but Guyana, like Trinidad and Tobago, continues to grow due to oil production.

In 2018, tourism made up 0.58 percent of Guyana's GDP (world average: 7.87).

Challenges 
After Independence, Guyana's national policies were focused on self-reliance; President Burnham called the tourism industry "parasitic" and detrimental to social development, in contrast to its Caribbean neighbors.

Infrastructure woes and perception of Guyana as a dangerous location damage tourism to and within the country. Recent focus has on improving safety standards, the visitor experience and enabling all tourism businesses to become licensed.

Domestic tourism 
Because of the diversity of Guyana, cultural events are an important source of tourism in the country. Guyana Restaurant Week started in 2014 to attract new customers with reasonably-priced set menus.

Organisations 
 Guyana Tourism Authority
 National Trust
 Tourism and Hospitality Association of Guyana
 The Carnegie School of Home Economics - Trade school with hospitality training

See also 

 Culture of Guyana
 List of airports in Guyana
 Visa policy of Guyana
 Wildlife of Guyana

References

External links
 

 
Guyana articles
Ecotourism
Sustainable tourism
Guyana
Guyana